Pouria Poursorkh (born 25 June 1976) is an Iranian actor. He received a Crystal Simorgh for Best Supporting Actor at the 25th Fajr Film Festival, in addition to multiple nominations for Hafez Awards.

Filmography

Films

TV Series

Theater 
 Lucky Comedy (in Sydney, Brisbane, Melbourne, Perth )
 Alfred

See also 
 Cinema of Iran

References

External links
 
 

1975 births
Living people
People from Tehran
Iranian male actors
Iranian male film actors
Iranian male television actors